Government Titumir College is a public educational institution in Bangladesh. It is located on the A.K. Khandakar Road in the Gulshan, Dhaka. This college is named after Mir Nesar Ali Titumir, who was killed fighting against British colonial rule. It is affiliated with the University of Dhaka.

History 
This college was established on 7 May 1968. Then it was named ‘Jinnah College’. In the turbulent days of Non Co-operation Movement on 3 March 1971, this college was named after the name of Shahid Titumir, erasing the name of Jinnah. This was done on the eve of the meeting of Maolana Abdul Hamid Khan Bhashani and Sheikh Mujibur Rahman at Paltan Maidan. It was led by the important central member of Sarbadaliya Chhatra Sangram Parishad and student of this College Colonel Md. Abdus Salam (Rtd), Bir Pratik.

Affiliation 
(7 May 1968 - 20 October 1992)- University of Dhaka

(21 October 1992 - 15 February 2017) - Bangladesh National University

(16 February 2017 - Present) - University of Dhaka

Structure 
As a government educational institution, it started as a Degree (Pass) college first. One of the important features of this college is to continue co-education in a generous and congenial environment.

Intermediate course was introduced in this college in 1970. This college was acknowledged by the Dhaka Education Board on 19 May 1971. On 31 May 1972, Honours courses were introduced in Bangla and Chemistry department under the University of Dhaka. M.A. (part-1) was started in this college in English, Political Science, Botany, Zoology and Maths subjects on 28 January 1995. Currently it provides Honours and Master's  courses on Bangla, English, Economics, Political Science, Philosophy, Sociology, Social Work, History, Islamic History & Culture, Islamic Studies, Physics, Chemistry, Botany, Zoology, Maths, Accounting, Management, Marketing and Finance & Banking. Moreover, it provides Non-credit optional ICT subject for Master's  students.

Faculties

Faculty of Arts & Social Science

 Department of Bangla
 Department of English
 Department of History
 Department of Islamic History & Culture
 Department of Philosophy
 Department of Islamic Studies
 Department of Economics
 Department of Political Science
 Department of Sociology
 Department of Social Work

Faculty of Science

 Department of Chemistry
 Department of Physics
 Department of Botany
 Department of Zoology
 Department of Statistics
 Department of Mathematics
 Department of Geography and Environmental Science
 Department of Psychology

Faculty of Business Studies

 Department of Accounting
 Department of Marketing
 Department of Management
 Department of Finance and Banking

Notable alumni 

Tipu Munshi - member of parliament, Trade Minister of Bangladesh
Shatabdi Wadud - actor
Hasan Masood-  actor

References 

1968 establishments in East Pakistan
Universities and colleges in Dhaka
Educational institutions established in 1968
University of Dhaka affiliates